Weeki Wachee is an unincorporated community and former city located in Hernando County, Florida, United States. As of the 2020 census, the community has a total population of 16. The  Weeki Wachee Preserve and the Weeki Wachee Springs park are located in the area. The park includes water rides, animal shows, mermaid costume shows, and manatee watching. The communities of Weeki Wachee Gardens and Spring Hill are nearby.

History
Weeki Wachee was founded as a city in 1966 to promote the local mermaid attraction. With fewer than 15 residents, and increased concerns over the city's finances, services, and state park operations, state representative Blaise Ingoglia sponsored a bill to dissolve the city, and Governor Ron DeSantis signed it into law in June 2020. Hernando County, the county the former city resides in, was responsible for resolving its financial issues. Park operations were not affected.

Geography

Demographics

As of the 2000 U.S. Census, there were 12 people, five households, and five families residing in the city. The population density was 11.8 people per square mile (4.5/km). There were five housing units at an average density of 4.9 per square mile (1.9/km). As identified by the census, no one in Weeki Wachee was Hispanic or Latino. All residents were White except for one Native American member of the Little River Band of Ottawa Indians.

Weeki Wachee Springs

Tourist attraction

Weeki Wachee Springs, the spring of the Weeki Wachee River, is a Florida tourist attraction where underwater performances by mermaids — women dressed in fancy outfits with fins about their legs — can be viewed in an aquarium-like setting. The attraction includes a Buccaneer Bay water park, animal shows, and boat rides. General Manager Robyn Anderson was the town's mayor. The park is now a Florida State Park and is owned and managed by the State Parks department.

Deepest naturally formed spring in the United States
From May 22 until August 30, 2007, the discharge level at Weeki Wachee spring dropped to a level that allowed for cave divers to gain effective entry into the cave system at the spring.

References

External links

 Weeki Wachee Springs, official site
 Weeki Wachee Cave System
 National Geographic: "Mermaids" Fight to Save Florida Roadside Attraction

Cities in Hernando County, Florida
Cities in the Tampa Bay area
Cities in Florida
Populated places disestablished in 2020
Former municipalities in Florida